Despina Vandi is a Greek laïko singer who was born in Stuttgart–Tübingen, West Germany and later raised in Kavala, Greece. She has had three records certified gold and 11 certified at least once platinum by the International Federation of the Phonographic Industry of Greece. Since the beginning of her recording career in 1994, Vandi has released eight studio albums in Greece and Cyprus: Gela Mou (1994), Esena Perimeno (1996), Profities (1999), Gia (2001), Stin Avli Tou Paradeisou (2004), 10 Hronia Mazi (2007), and C'est La Vie (2010). She has also released one live album, titled Despina Vandi Live and two studio albums abroad: Gia (2003) and Come Along Now (2005). Vandi's releases have been issued on the record labels Minos EMI (1994–2000), Heaven Music (2001–09), and The Spicy Effect (2010–present).

Vandi has been awarded mostly in laïko and dance music categories. Since receiving her first nomination of her career in 1997, Vandi has won three Pop Corn Music Awards for Best Female Singer, Best Female Stage Performance, and Best Song, as well as three Arion Music Awards for Female Artist of the Year, Best-Selling Album of 2002 for Gia, and Live Album of the Year. Both of the aforementioned awards ceremonies have served as the national awards ceremonies until their respective cancellations. Vandi's first and most significant international award came in 2002 at the World Music Awards where she was awarded as being the Best-Selling Greek Artist of 2001; she was the first Greek artist actually recording in Greece to receive the award, and one of four overall. As Vandi began receiving international exposure while pursuing a career abroad during the period of 2003–05, her music and remixes of it earned awards and nominations at international dance music-oriented award ceremonies. She also received honours from dance-oriented radio stations in the United States, Portugal, and Russia. Since 2004, Vandi has received ten MAD Video Music Awards, including Female Artist of the Year and Artist of the Year, making her the second most honoured female artist and tied for third most honoured artist overall in the award's history as of 2010. In addition to these recognized awards, Vandi has also received an honorary award by Richard Branson of Virgin for her single "Ipofero", which was recognized as the best-selling single of all-time at the Greek Virgin Megastores, after surpassing sales of 100 thousand copies, while in March 2010 Alpha TV ranked her the top-certified Greek female artist of the phonographic era (since 1960), making her the youngest artist in both age and career longevity within the top ten. Overall, Vandi has received 57(8Honorary) recognized awards from 90+ nominations. She is also o coach at "The Voice of Greece"(2014–15)she is also the Winner Coach of the first season and she is second at this season.

Arion Music Awards
The Arion Music Awards are the official Greek music industry awards by IFPI Greece since 2002, after the Pop Corn Music Awards, which were organized by the Greek magazine Pop Corn from 1992–2001, were discontinued. The Arions were broadcast by Mega Channel in their first five years before moving to ANT1 channel. The awards have not been held since 2007 for various reasons. Despina Vandi has won three awards from ten nominations.

|-
| rowspan="2" align="center"|2003
|  rowspan="1" |Ante Gia
| Female Singer of the Year
|
|-
|  rowspan="1" |Gia
| Best-Selling Album of the Year
|
|-
| rowspan="2" align="center"|2004
|  rowspan="2" |Despina Vandi Live
| Female Singer of the Year
|
|-
| Live Album of the Year
|
|-
| rowspan="5" align="center"|2005
|  rowspan="3" |Despina Vandi
| Laiko Female Singer
|
|-
| Pop Female Singer
|
|-
| Female Singer of the Year
|
|-
|  rowspan="2" |Stin Avli Tou Paradisou
| Pop Album
|
|-
| Album of the Year
|
|-
| rowspan="1" align="center"|2006
|  rowspan="1" |Special Edition
| Female Singer of the Year
|
|-

Balkan Music Awards
On December 7, 2009, Balkanika Music Television officially announced the start of the First Balkan Music Awards 2010.

Despina Vandi has two nominations for the Balkan Music Awards 2011 and one nomination for the Balkan Music Awards 2012.

|-
| rowspan="2" align="center"|2011
|  rowspan="1" |Kommati Ap' Tin Kardia Sou
| Best Song in the Balkans from Republic of Greece for 2010
|
|-
|  rowspan="1" |Despina Vandi
| Best Female Artist in the Balkans for 2010
|
|-
| rowspan="1" align="center"|2012
|  rowspan="1" |Erota Theli I Zoi (Remix), Despina Vandi feat. Ypohthonios
| Best Song in the Balkans from Republic of Greece for 2011
|
|-

Daf BAMA Music Awards
The Daf BAMA Music Awards is a tremendous effort to honor the artists who have spread their charms, breaking the boundary between the countries. The most talented artistic personas in music industry in the eastern European countries are awarded. Every culture has their own taste of music and songs, creating an amazingly rich multiplicity of people of these countries. From Gazal singers to Rap artists, singers from all genres are being presented gloriously in front of the world under one banner.

|-
| rowspan="1" align="center"|2016
|  rowspan="1" |Despina Vandi
| Favorite Greek Artist
| 
|-

Hit FM Russia Awards
Despina Vandi has won one award from one nomination.

|-
| rowspan="1" align="center"|2004
|  rowspan="1" |Come Along Now
| Honorary Award
|
|-

House Music Awards
Vandi herself has been won once, while her work has been nominated three times, having one once.

|-
| rowspan="2" align="center"|2004
|  rowspan="1" |Gia, Ultra Records
| Best Vocal
|
|-

International Dance Music Awards
The Winter Music Conference was established in 1985. It is a part of the Winter Music Conference, a weeklong electronic music event held annually. Despina Vandi has been won as Best New Dance Artist Solo for the 20th Annual IDMA.

|-
| rowspan="1" align="center"|2005
|  rowspan="1" |Despina Vandi
| Best New Dance Artist Solo
|
|-

MAD Music Awards Cyprus
The MAD Music Awards Cyprus created by MAD TV Cyprus in 2015. They are similar to Greek MAD Video Music Awards.

|-
| rowspan="2" align="center"|2015
| rowspan="1" |Despina Vandi
| Best Female Artist
|
|-
| rowspan="1" |Kane Kati
| Best Video Clip of the Year
| 
|-
| rowspan="2" align="center"|2016
| Mia Anasa Maria Sou
| Best Single of the Year
|
|-
| Despina Vandi
| Best Live in Cyprus
|
|-

MAD Video Music Awards
The MAD Video Music Awards are held annually in June by MAD TV since 2004. In its first two years, the awards were televised on ANT1 for non-satellite viewers, but have since moved to Alpha TV. Despina Vandi has received 14 awards from 37 nominations.
 
|-
| rowspan="1" align="center"|2004
|  rowspan="1" |Despina Vandi
| Artist of the Year with the Most Played Video Clip
|
|-
| rowspan="6" align="center"|2005
|  rowspan="1" |Happy End
| Best Contemporary Laiko Video Clip
|
|-
|  rowspan="4" |Come Along Now, Phoebus feat. Despina Vandi
| Best Dance Video Clip
|
|-
| Best Video Clip of a Woman Artist
|
|-
| Best Video Clip of the Year
|
|-
| Best-Dressed Artist in a Video Clip
|
|-
|  rowspan="1" |Despina Vandi
| Artist of the Year with the Most Played Video Clip
|
|-
| rowspan="5" align="center"|2006
|  rowspan="3" |Stin Avli Tou Paradisou
| Best Contemporary Laiko Video Clip
|
|-
| Best Female Artist Video Clip
|
|-
| Best Direction in a Video Clip (Kostas Kapetanidis)
|
|-
|  rowspan="1" |Jambi, Despina Vandi - Phoebus
| Best Dance Video Clip
|
|-
|  rowspan="1" |Despina Vandi
| Artist of the Year with the Most Played Video Clip
|
|-
| rowspan="3" align="center"|2007
|  rowspan="2" |Kalanta
| Best Dance Video Clip
|
|-
| Best Direction in a Video Clip (Kostas Kapetanidis)
|
|-
|  rowspan="1" |Amane, Despina Vandi - Giorgos Mazonakis
| Best Duet Video Clip
|
|-
| rowspan="2" align="center"|2008
|  rowspan="1" |Thelo
| Best Pop Video Clip
|
|-
|  rowspan="1" |Despina Vandi
| Best Female Artist
|
|-
| rowspan="1" align="center"|2009
|  rowspan="1" |Despina Vandi
| Best Female Artist
|
|-
| rowspan="1" align="center"|2010
|  rowspan="1" |Despina Vandi
| Best Female Artist
|
|-
| rowspan="3" align="center"|2011
| rowspan="1" |Koritsi Prama
| Video Clip Pop
|
|-
|  rowspan="1" |Erota Theli I Zoi Ke Ohi Polemo (Erota Theli I Zoi)
| Lyric - Cue
|
|-
|  rowspan="1" |Despina Vandi
| Female Artist
|
|-
| rowspan="3" align="center"|2012
| rowspan="1" |Girismata
| Video Clip MAD Greekz
|
|-
|  rowspan="1" |Ehi O Keros Girismata (Girismata)
| Lyric - Cue
|
|-
|  rowspan="1" |Despina Vandi
| Female Artist
|
|-
| rowspan="4" align="center"|2013
| rowspan="1" |Katalaveno
| Fashion Icon in a Video Clip
|
|-
| rowspan="1" |Despina Vandi
| Female Artist
|
|-
| To Asteri Mou
| rowspan="2" | Top 50
|
|-
| To Nisi
|
|-
| rowspan="4" align="center"|2014
| rowspan="1" |Hano Esena
| Video Clip Pop
|
|-
| rowspan="2" |Despina Vandi
| Female Artist
|
|-
| Artist of the Year
|
|-
| rowspan="1" |Hano Esena
| Video Clip of the Year
|
|-
| rowspan="4" align="center"|2015
| rowspan="1" |Despina Vandi
| Female Artist
|
|-
| rowspan="2" |Kane Kati
| Best MAD Greekζ Video
|
|-
| Best Video of the Year
|
|-
| rowspan="1" |Ola Allazoun
| Best Pop Video
|
|-
| rowspan="3" align="center"|2016
| rowspan="1" |Despina Vandi
| Best Female Adult (Female Artist)
|
|-
| rowspan="2" |Mia Anasa Makria Sou
| Best Video of the Year
|
|-
| Best Pop Video
|
|-
| rowspan="2" align="center"|2017
| rowspan="2" |Despina Vandi
| Best Female Adult (Female Artist)
|
|-
| Superfans Of The Year
|
|-

MTV Europe Music Awards
The MTV Europe Music Awards ("EMAs" or "EMA") are an event presented by MTV Networks Europe which awards prizes to musicians and performers. The first EMAs ceremony was held in 1994.[1] Originally conceived as an alternative to the MTV Video Music Awards and since 2011 other worldwide, regional nominations have been added. Despina Vandi has one nomination for the MTV Europe Music Awards 2014.

|-
| rowspan="1" align="center"|2014
|  rowspan="1" |Despina Vandi
| Best Greek Act
|
|-
| rowspan="1" align="center"|2015
| rowspan="1" |Despina Vandi
| Best Greek Act
|
|-

Must Magazine Style Awards
Despina Vandi was nominated in the first "Must Magazine Style Awards", organized by the Cypriot "Must Magazine".

|-
| rowspan="1" align="center"|2011
|  rowspan="1" |Despina Vandi
| Best Greek style icon
|
|-

Oriflame Directors' Seminar Awards 
Despina Vandi has won one award from one nomination.
|-
| rowspan="1" align="center"|2010
|  rowspan="1" |Despina Vandi
| Beauty & Business Face of the Year
|
|-

Pop Corn Music Awards
The Greek Pop Corn Music Awards are a defunct awards ceremony that were the first official Greek music awards show from 1992-2001 and were organized by the Greek magazine Pop Corn. The Arion Music Awards became the new national music awards ceremony in 2001 after the Pop Corns were discontinued. Despina Vandi has received seven awards from fourteen nominations.

|-
| rowspan="1" align="center"|1997
|  rowspan="1" |Despina Vandi
| Best Female Artist
|
|-
| rowspan="3" align="center"|1998
|  rowspan="2" |Despina Vandi
| Best Female Stage Presence
|
|-
| Best Female Artist
|
|-
|  rowspan="1" |Thelo Na Se Ksehaso
| Best Female Interpretation
|
|-
| rowspan="5" align="center"|1999
|  rowspan="2" |Despina Vandi
| Best Female Artist
|
|-
| Best Female Stage Presence
|
|-
|  rowspan="1" |Katalliles Proipothesis feat. Giorgos Lempesis
| Best Duet
|
|-
|  rowspan="2" |Oute Ena Efharisto
| Best Female Interpretation
|
|-
| Best Video Clip (Dimitris Sotas)
|
|-
| rowspan="2" align="center"|2000
|  rowspan="1" |Profities
| Best Album
|
|-
|  rowspan="1" |Apapa
| Best Laiko Song
|
|-
| rowspan="3" align="center"|2001
|  rowspan="2" |Despina Vandi
| Best Female Singer
|
|-
| Best Female Stage Presence
|
|-
|  rowspan="1" |Gia
| Best Song
|
|-

Rádio Nova Era Awards
Despina Vandi has won one award from one nomination.

|-
| rowspan="1" align="center"|2004
|  rowspan="1" |Despina Vandi
| Best international dance artist for the year 2004
|
|-

Star Radio Awards
Despina Vandi has won one award from one nomination.

|-
| rowspan="1" align="center"|2003
|  rowspan="1" |Despina Vandi, Gia
| Best International Artist
|
|-

World Music Awards
The World Music Award is an international awards show founded in 1989 that annually honors recording artists based on worldwide sales figures provided by the International Federation of the Phonographic Industry (IFPI). The awards show is conducted under the patronage of H.S.H. Prince Albert of Monaco, Monte-Carlo.

The show is broadcast to North and South America, all of Europe, the Middle East, Japan and South East Asia, all of China, some other parts of Asia, Australia, New Zealand, and all of Africa, reaching an estimated worldwide audience of around one billion viewers, in over 160 countries.

The regional awards, as many of the other awards, are not awarded standard annually, but when it is believed that the artist has sold a notable number of records in his or her respective category or genre. Despina Vandi has won one award from one nomination.

|-
| rowspan="1" align="center"|2004
|  rowspan="1" |Despina Vandi
| World's Best-Selling Greek Artist
|
|-

Other honours
 In 2001, Vandi received an honorary award from Richard Branson of Virgin for the sales of her single "Ipofero", which was recognized as the best-selling single in history at the Greek Virgin Megastores after surpassing sales of 100 thousand copies and being certified five times platinum by IFPI Greece.
 In 2003, Vandi was voted as the Best-Dressed Woman in Showbiz in a competition held by MAD TV. She was one of only two musicians honoured, the other being Sakis Rouvas.
 In December 2009, Down Town featured Vandi in its "Best of the Decade" issue.
 On 14 March 2010, Alpha TV ranked her the fourth top-certified Greek female artist by IFPI Greece during the phonographic era (since 1960).

References

Vandi, Despina
Awards